Schrankia solitaria is a species of moth of the family Erebidae. It was described by David Stephen Fletcher in 1961. It is found in Uganda.

References

Moths described in 1961
Hypenodinae